Anaccra limitana is a species of moth of the family Tortricidae. It is found in Cameroon.

References

Endemic fauna of Cameroon
Moths described in 1966
Tortricini
Moths of Africa
Taxa named by Józef Razowski